Louis Hostin (21 April 1908 – 28 June 1998) was a French weightlifter. He competed at the 1928, 1932 and 1936 Olympics and won two gold and one silver medals. Hostin also won two European titles, in 1930 and 1935, and two medals at world championships in 1937–1938. Between 1927 and 1939 he won 13 national titles and set 10 official world records: 7 in the snatch and 3 in the clean and jerk.

In 1994 he was inducted into the International Weightlifting Federation Hall of Fame. He worked as a croupier.

References

External links

1908 births
1998 deaths
French male weightlifters
Olympic weightlifters of France
Weightlifters at the 1928 Summer Olympics
Weightlifters at the 1932 Summer Olympics
Weightlifters at the 1936 Summer Olympics
Olympic gold medalists for France
Olympic silver medalists for France
Olympic medalists in weightlifting
Sportspeople from Saint-Étienne
Medalists at the 1936 Summer Olympics
Medalists at the 1932 Summer Olympics
Medalists at the 1928 Summer Olympics
People associated with physical culture
World Weightlifting Championships medalists
20th-century French people